Minuscule 606 (in the Gregory-Aland numbering), OΘ 10 (von Soden), is a Greek minuscule manuscript of the New Testament, on parchment. Palaeographically it has been assigned to the 11th century. The manuscript is lacunose. Formerly it was labeled by 127a and
154p.

Description 

The codex contains the text of the Acts of the Apostles, Catholic epistles, Pauline epistles on 373 parchment leaves (size ), with only one lacuna (Philemon 7-25). The text is written in one column per page, 28-31 lines per page. The manuscript is carelessly written.

It has scholia to the Catholic epistles. The biblical text is surrounded by a catena. The commentary is of Theodoret's authorship.

The order of books: Acts, Catholic, and Pauline epistles. Epistle to the Hebrews is placed after Epistle to Ephesians and before Epistle to the Philippians.

Text 

The Greek text of the codex is a mixture of text-types. Aland did not place it in any Category.

History 

The manuscript was added to the list of New Testament manuscripts by Johann Martin Augustin Scholz. It was collated by Reiche. It was examined and described by Paulin Martin. C. R. Gregory saw the manuscript in 1885.

Formerly it was labeled by 127a and 154p. In 1908 Gregory gave the number 606 to it.

The manuscript currently is housed at the Bibliothèque nationale de France (Gr. 217), at Paris.

See also 

 List of New Testament minuscules
 Biblical manuscript
 Textual criticism

References

Further reading 

 

Greek New Testament minuscules
11th-century biblical manuscripts
Bibliothèque nationale de France collections